Ølen Church is a parish church of the Church of Norway in Vindafjord Municipality in Rogaland county, Norway. It is located in the village of Ølensjøen. It is one of the two churches for the Ølen og Bjoa parish which is part of the Haugaland prosti (deanery) in the Diocese of Stavanger. The white, wooden church was built in a long church style in 1874 using designs by the architect T. Solheim. The church seats about 550 people.

History

The first known church at Ølen was a stave church that was first mentioned in historical records in 1326, but it was not new that year. In 1733, the old church was heavily renovated and rebuilt with a new timber-framed nave being built by the priest of Fjelberg Church who owned the church at that time. Some of the old materials from the old building were reused in the new addition.

This church at Ølen was consecrated on 20 November 1874 by the local Dean Kierulff from Stord Church. Shortly afterwards, the old church was torn down, but the small entrance area to the old church was kept and converted into a small tool shed that would be used for the cemetery. The cemetery that surrounded the old church is still in use today as there was no room for a cemetery at the site of the new church.

See also
List of churches in Rogaland

References

Vindafjord
Churches in Rogaland
Wooden churches in Norway
19th-century Church of Norway church buildings
Churches completed in 1874
13th-century establishments in Norway